Shearman Montague Haslip (13 May 1897 – 4 July 1968) was an English first-class cricketer active 1919–20 who played for Middlesex and Marylebone Cricket Club. He was born in Twickenham; died in Weymouth.

References

1897 births
1968 deaths
English cricketers
Middlesex cricketers
Marylebone Cricket Club cricketers
H. D. G. Leveson Gower's XI cricketers
P. F. Warner's XI cricketers